No. 33 Squadron is a unit of the Indian Air Force assigned to Southern Air Command based in Trivandrum. The Squadron participates in operations involving air, land and airdrop of troops, equipment, supplies, and support or augment special operations forces, when appropriate.

History
The Caribous were raised in 1963 at Gauhati and moved to the present location.

Lineage
 Constituted as No. 33 Squadron (Caribous) on 9 January 1963

Assignments
 Indo-Pakistani War of 1965
 Indo-Pakistani War of 1971

Aircraft
 DHC-4
 AN-32

References

033